Beyoğluspor Kulübü, also known as the Beyoğlu Sports Club, or by its historic Greek name of Pera Sports Club, or simply Pera Club, is an amateur sports club based in Istanbul, Turkey. It fields teams in volleyball, basketball and football.

History

Since the second half of the 19th century the Greek community of Constantinople founded several sports clubs and organized sports activities such as the Pan-Constantinopolitan Games.

The club claims it was founded in Pera in 1877, by three local Greek intellectuals, K.D. Kostarakis, I.A. Zervoudakis and A.K. Stefopoulos, as Clio Sports Club. In 1884, it was renamed to Hermès Sport Club, in which the football department was founded in 1914. With the establishment of the Republic of Turkey in 1923 it was briefly renamed Pera Sports Club and, later that year, was formally registered as "Beyoğlu Spor Kulübü".

Until 1926, the club's activities were housed in the deserted gym of Hermes SC. However, after 1926 the club moved to the building of the "Ladies Charity Fraternity of Pera", also located in the region of Beyoğlu. Initially, Beyoğluspor maintained two departments, football and gymnastics. Later, there were established departments of wrestling and boxing and in 1926 of basketball and volleyball.

During its history, many of the club's departments had been awarded in a variety of competitions. The Volleyball department of Beyoğluspor was one of the most distinguished teams in Turkey during the 1940s and 1950s, while it also won the Turkish championship for some years that period. The football team managed to capture the fifth place at the Istanbul Football League in 1945, while in the early 1960s it competed in the First League. The efforts of the club managers and presidents, such as G. Chalkousis, S. Kanakis, G. Mouzakis, A. Tripos, played a determining part in these successes. On the other hand, several athletes were distinguished both in Greek but also in international level, like the World Champion in weightlifting and latter coach of the Greek weightlifting team, Christos Iakovou. Beyoğluspor didn't field senior team from late 90s to 2014 due to money shortage. Finally Beyoğluspor joined 6th Group of Istanbul 2nd Amateur League, lowest amateur level for İstanbul teams in 2014–15 season. They finished this group as sixth.

Popularity
The majority of the fans were among the Greek community of the city. However, Beyoğluspor witnessed a dramatic decrease of its supporters for a period when Lefter Küçükandonyadis, a Turkish national football team player of Greek descent and one of the best players in Turkey in 1950s and 1960s, played for Fenerbahçe, turning most of the local Greeks to change temporarily their support to Fenerbahçe.

Present situation
Today, Beyoğluspor is one of the few surviving Greek foundations of the city and fields teams in volleyball, basketball and football at the amateur level.

League participation for football branch

 First League: 1962–1964
 Second League: 1964–1967
 Third League: 1967–1973, 1984–1987
 Amateur League: 1877-1962, 1973–1984, 1987–present

Notable athletes
 Christos Iakovou, weightlifter and former coach of Greek National Weightlifting Team
 Kadri Aytaç, football player
 Şükrü Gülesin, football player
 Kostas Negrepontis, football player
 Themos Asderis, football player
 Koço Kasapoğlu, football player
 Alekos Sofianidis, football player

See also
 Kurtuluş SK, another still existing sports club in Istanbul founded by local Greeks.

References

Football clubs in Istanbul
Beyoğlu SK
Association football clubs established in 1923
1923 establishments in Turkey
Süper Lig clubs
Greek sports clubs outside Greece